Industrial and Financial Group SAFMAR is a Russian multisectoral conglomerate. The Group includes oil producing, oil processing, coal and potash companies, financial assets, retail chains, construction and development holdings, companies engaged in commercial property management, logistics centers, hotels, media resources among which are radio stations and TV channels.

History 
Safmar Group was established by Mikhail Gutseriev, a Russian entrepreneur. The name SAFMAR is comprised from the first letters of his parents’ names Safarbek and Marem. Industrial companies owned by Mr. Gutseriev appeared to be the cornerstone of the Group. Their dynamic development allowed allocating the funds for the purchase of the new assets in different sectors thus leading to business diversification.  This portfolio of assets required efficient management for which a joint stock company Safmar Group was incorporated. Mikhail Gutseriev is the Chairman of the Group's Board of Directors and he determines the conglomerate's development strategy. Said Gutseriev, the entrepreneur and the son of Mikhail Gutseriev, is the co-owner of SAFMAR.

In 2019 two major industrial companies were included into SAFMAR Group. In April the holding purchased Afipsky oil refinery, and in October SAFMAR became the major shareholder in Kuzbasskaya Toplivnaya Company PJSC.

In September 2019 SAFMAR Industrial and Financial Group was inсluded into RBK 500 top list, being the 9th among the major state and private corporations of Russia.

Forbes Russia ranked the Gutseriev family as the leader among the richest Russian families with their US$5.65 bn common fortune.

Courts 
In October 2019 Forbes Russia published the article about a trillion debt of the Gutseriev family and Mr. Shishkhanov, his nephew, found by Trust, the bank of “toxic” assets. Safmar said this information was “fake news” and “a perfect example of the most corrupted and cheapest yellow press”, the company also reported some pieces of information were “far-fetched” and  “invented”, along with that Safmar did not exclude the defamation action. In the end the defamation action against Safmar was executed by Forbes Russia publisher. On the 10th of December Safmar and Mikhail Gutseriev filed a claim against the magazine to the Arbitration Court of Moscow requiring to delete the article.

Assets 
Currently the major Safmar assets are focused in the following industrial sectors.

Heavy industry 
The assets of the Group include: 
 PJSC “RussNeft”, an oil producing holding. The Company operates in 7 Russian regions. The holding's structure consists of:  
 OAO Varioganneft (Khanty-Mansi Autonomous Region);
 OAO Aganneftegazgeologiya (Khanty-Mansi Autonomous Region);
 OAO NAK Aki-Otyr (Khanty-Mansi Autonomous Region);
 OOO Beliye Nochi (Khanty-Mansi Autonomous Region);
 ST AO Goloil (Khanty-Mansi Autonomous Region);
 OAO Chernogorskoye (Khanty-Mansi Autonomous Region)
 OAO Saratovneftegaz (Saratov Region);
 OAO Ulyanovskneft (Ulyanovsk and Penza Regions);
 OAO Tomskaya Neft (Tomsk Region)
 OOO NK Russneft-Bryansk (operating of the oil loading terminal in Bryansk region).
 Neftisa, an oil producing company with the subsidiaries in 7 regions of Russia:
 AO Belkamneft named after A. Volkov (Udmurtia);
 AO Novosibirskneftegaz (Novosibirsk region);
 AO Komnedra (The Republic of Komi);
 OOO CanBaikal (Khanty-Mansi Autonomous Region);
 OOO PIT Cibintek (Tuymen Region)
 AO Samarainvestneft (Samara Region)
 AO Uralnefteservis (Perm Region).
 OOO Sladkovsko-Zarechnoye (oil production in Orenburg region)
 AO ForteInvest is a vertically integrated company managing the following assets:
 PSJC Orsknefteorgsintez (Orenburg region)
 OOO Afipsky NPZ (Krasnodar Region);
 Producing companies in Orenburg region.
 PJSC Adamas Company (manages AO Krasnodarsky refinery - Krasnоdareconeft)
 PJSC Russian Coal with 6 subsidiaries operating in 4 regions of Russia:
 AO Amurugol (Amur Region);
 AO Kranoyarskkrayugol (Krasnoyarsk Region);
 Sayano-Partizansky Pit (Krasnoyarsk Region);
 AO UK Stepnoy Pit (Khakasiya)
 OOO Kirbinsky Pit (Khakasiya);
 PJSC Kuzbasskaya Toplivnaya Company (Kemerovo).
 GCM Global Energy Inc. (owns producing assets in the Republic of Azerbaijan and the Republic Kazakhstan)
 OOO Slavkaliy (implements the major investment project of mining complex construction in Belarus with the annual producing capacity of 2 mln tons of potassium; the proved and probable reserves from the site's I and II horizons make up 112 mln tons of potassium chloride (acc. to JORC).

The revenue from the conglomerate's industrial assets in 2021 exceeded 1.1 trillion rubles.

Light industry is represented in the group by OAO Saltykovsky Fur Farm engaged in breeding elite fur animals (sable, mink, fox, etc.) and wholesale of the fur of the abovementioned animals, growing animals and meat products.

Financial assets 
Financial assets owned by Safmar Group are managed by Safmar Financial Investments. The holding includes:
 AO NPF  SAFMAR (in March 2019 was united with Doveriye NPF)
 AO NPF Mospromstroy Fond
 AO Evroplan Leasing Company 
 VSK Insurance company (49% share)
 OOO Direct Credit Center (loan broker)

PJSC Safmar Financial Investments shares are included into MOEX top quotation list (stock ticker: SFIN), as of 2019 the holding's capitalization makes up around 50 bn RUB.

In 2019 Mikhail Gutseriev stopped being the shareholder of Safmar financial investment by transferring his share in the holding to Said Gutseriev, his son, who has currently consolidated 30.4% of shares of the public non-bank financial holding SAFMAR financial investment.

In 2019 SAFMAR Financial Investments, being the sole shareholder of NPF Safmar, will allocate the dividends received from him for the purchase of the part of the assets included into the risk portfolio of the pension savings of the fund.

Construction and development 
SAFMAR Group owns major construction and development assets:
 AO Mospromstroy (one of the leading construction holdings in Moscow);
 GK A101 (development company, full service)

The group is one of the major developers in Moscow region and owns one of the best land plots portfolios in the New Moscow (exceeding 2500 ha).

Hospitality Business 
Safmar Group leads in hospitality business in Moscow, it owns 9 luxury hotels in the capital of Russia as well as the hotels in Minsk and Astana, among which are National Hotel, Intercontinental Tverskaya, Sheraton Palace, Marriott Grand, Marriott Royal Aurora, Marriott Tverskaya, Hilton Leningradsakaya, Holiday Inn Lesnaya, Holiday Inn Sushevskiy, Renaissance Minsk, Astana Marriott. Total capacity of these hotels makes up 2 794 rooms.

Property Management 
Safmar Group owns:
 PJSC A.N.D. Corporation (manages the operates malls and office property in Moscow Region);
 MLP Company (owns 9 major logistics complexes in Russia and CIS countries);
 OOO Pioner Estate (manages multi-purpose commercial property).

The total area of the Group's commercial property exceeds 

In its Kings of the Russian Property rating Forbes awarded the third place Safmar Group which received a US$580 mln annual income from lease in 2019.

Retail 
Safmar Group also owns PJSC M.Video, the largest Russian company selling home appliances and electronics. The Company was incorporated in March 2018 in result of merging M.Video and Eldorado. The revenue of the company after merging in 2018 increased RUB 420 bn, which allowed the company to outplay DNS, its major segment rival, and to take the first place among the electronics retailers. Q1 2019 defined M.Video as the major online electronics retailer in Russia.

In summer 2018 Safmar purchased the majority stake in the Russian branch of Media Markt, German electronics retailer. The retail areas were upgraded for M.Video and Eldorado. Herewith the German Ceconomy holding which controlled MediaMarkt in Russia became the owner of M.Video shares.

Media Assets 
Safmar owns 7 federal radio stations and Bridge Media, a television holding.

Radio stations:
 Radio Shanson;
 Radio Dacha;
 Vesna FM;
 Vostok FM;
 Love radio;
 Russian Hit;
 Taxi FM.

TV Channels:
 Bridge TV;
 Bridge TV Russian Hit;
 Bridge TV Classic;
 Bridge TV Hits;
 Bridge TV Deluxe.

References

External links 
  

Russian brands
Conglomerate companies of Russia
Companies based in Moscow
Russia
Natural gas companies of Russia
Oil companies of Russia